Hologerrhum philippinum, commonly known as the Philippine stripe-lipped snake, is a species of snake in the family Cyclocoridae. It is endemic to the Philippines, and is found on the islands of Luzon and Polillo.

References 

Cyclocoridae
Snakes of Asia
Reptiles of the Philippines
Endemic fauna of the Philippines
Taxa named by Albert Günther
Reptiles described in 1858